The 22nd Secretariat of the Communist Party of the Soviet Union was elected by the 22nd Central Committee in the aftermath of the 22nd Congress.

List of members

References

Secretariat of the Central Committee of the Communist Party of the Soviet Union members
1961 establishments in the Soviet Union
1966 disestablishments in the Soviet Union